Zokhir Kuziboyev (born 11 March 1986) is an Uzbek footballer who plays as a forward for Nasaf Qarshi in the Uzbek League.

Career
He played in 2012 for Nasaf-2. Since 2013 he plays for Mash'al Mubarek. At the end of the season Mash'al promoted to Uzbek League and Kuziboyev became club best goalscorer and 2nd best First League topscorer with 20 goals. In 2014 season he scored 14 goals in Uzbek League and became 2nd best goalscorer with 14 goals after Artur Gevorkyan. He is Mash'al's top goalscorer in 2013-14.

In January 2016 he moved to Nasaf Qarshi.

International career
On 24 March 2015 Kuziboyev was called up for the first time to national team to play against South Korea on 27 March 2015 in Daejeon. He scored his first goal for national team in debut match against South Korea. Kuziboyev's goal ensured Uzbekistan held South Korea to a 1-1 draw.

Honours
 Uzbekistan First League (1): 2013
 UzPFL Cup (1): 2014

Career statistics

Club

International
Goals for Senior National Team

References

External links

Zokhir Kuziboyev at SoccerPunter.com

Uzbekistani footballers
1986 births
Living people
Association football forwards
Uzbekistan Super League players
FK Mash'al Mubarek players
Uzbekistan international footballers